Paul Theron Silas (July 12, 1943 – December 10, 2022) was an American professional basketball player and head coach in the National Basketball Association (NBA). As a player, he was a two-time NBA All-Star and earned five selections to the NBA All-Defensive Team, including twice on the first team. He won three NBA championships: two with the Boston Celtics and one with the Seattle SuperSonics.

In high school, Silas was named a second-team Parade All-American and voted  California Mr. Basketball. He played college basketball for the Creighton Bluejays, earning second-team All-American honors as a senior in 1964. He was selected in the second round of the 1964 NBA draft, and played 16 seasons in the league. After his playing career, Silas was a head coach for 12 seasons.

Early life
Silas was born on July 12, 1943, in Prescott, Arkansas. His family moved to Oakland, California, when he was eight. Initially, they shared a home in Oakland with his cousins, four of whom became members of the rhythm & blues group The Pointer Sisters.

Silas attended McClymonds High School, where he was named California Mr. Basketball and a second-team Parade All-American as a senior. He was undefeated with the Warriors, who went 68–0 and were the  1 team in California from 1958 to 1960. His teammates included future pro basketball players Jim Hadnot and Joe Ellis, football player Wendell Hayes, and baseball player  Aaron Pointer, another cousin of Silas.

College career
Silas attended Creighton University, where he set an NCAA record for the most rebounds in a three-year career and was the Division I rebounding leader for the 1962–63 season with 20.6 rebounds per game. He was named a second-team All-American by the National Association of Basketball Coaches in 1964. Silas' career scoring average was over 20 points per game. However, his offense dropped after he suffered a torn tendon in his right leg as a junior, after which, he focused on his inside game. He was voted into the National Collegiate Basketball Hall of Fame in 2017.

Professional playing career
Silas was selected by the St. Louis Hawks in the second round of the 1964 NBA draft with the 12th overall pick. After a relatively slow career start, Silas reached double figures in both rebounds and points per game during the 1967–68 season, in which he averaged 11.7 rebounds per game and 13.4 points per game.  His rebounding average was third best on the Hawks that season, behind teammates Zelmo Beaty (11.7 rpg) and Bill Bridges (13.4 rpg). After five seasons with the Hawks, Silas was traded to the Phoenix Suns for Gary Gregor, who had been named to the 1969 NBA All-Rookie Team.

During his three seasons with the Suns, Silas averaged a double-double in rebounds and points each season, was named to the NBA All-Defensive Second Team in 1971 and 1972, and played in the 1972 NBA All-Star Game. During the 1971–72 season, his third with the Suns, Silas grabbed 955 rebounds in 80 games, and scored what would be a career-high 17.5 points per game. In September 1972, Silas was sent to the Boston Celtics in a deal which allowed the Suns to acquire the rights to Charlie Scott, who had led the American Basketball Association in scoring with 34.6 points per game during its 1971–72 season.

While with the Celtics, Silas was named to the NBA All-Defensive Second Team in 1973, the NBA All-Defensive First Team in 1975 and 1976, and played in the 1975 NBA All-Star Game. Silas was a key contributor to the Celtics' NBA championships in 1974 and 1976. His inside play freed up their undersized center,  Dave Cowens, whose shooting ability from the outside opened up the interior for Silas.

Following their title in 1976, Boston general manager Red Auerbach traded Silas to the Denver Nuggets after a salary dispute. After one season (1976–77) with the Nuggets, Silas was traded to the Seattle SuperSonics. He played an important role with Seattle as an enforcer, and the SuperSonics reached the championship series in both 1978 and 1979 with Silas, winning an NBA title in 1979 in five games in a rematch against the Washington Bullets.  

During his NBA career, Silas collected more than 10,000 points and 10,000 rebounds over sixteen seasons, played in two NBA All-Star games, and won three championship rings (two with the Boston Celtics in 1974 and 1976, and one with the Seattle SuperSonics in 1979). He was named to the All-NBA Defensive First Team twice, and to the All-NBA Defensive Second Team three times.

Coaching career
Immediately upon retirement, Silas started his coaching career with the San Diego Clippers from 1980 to 1983, becoming their head coach, compiling a 78–168 record for a team that struggled with injuries to stars including Bill Walton.  After taking time off, Silas was an assistant coach for the New Jersey Nets for one season from 1988 to 1989, and then became an assistant coach with the New York Knicks from 1989 to 1992 as one of the holdovers from the Stu Jackson and John Macleod eras. Silas then went back to work for the Nets as an assistant under Chuck Daly and later Butch Beard from 1992 to 1995, leaving to work with the Suns from 1995 to 1997. At one point, Silas was one of the names considered for the head coaching job of the Boston Celtics in the summer of 1995, before general manager M.L. Carr decided to name himself as coach of the team.

After joining the coaching staff of the Charlotte Hornets in 1997, Silas was finally given another chance as a coach after becoming the interim coach of the Hornets when Dave Cowens was fired after a 4–11 record. Under Silas, the Hornets turned it around and went 22–13 to finish the lockout-shortened season 26–24, missing the playoffs by one game. Silas had the interim tag lifted off of his status and became the full-time head coach of the Hornets from 1999 all the way into their first season where they moved to New Orleans. Coaching the team from 1999 to 2003, Silas had a 208–155 record, taking the team into the playoffs each season he was the head coach after that 1999 season, including two Eastern Conference Semifinals appearances. Silas had a reputation of being a coach who was very honest but fair with his criticism of his players, which they mostly appreciated. Silas was fired as coach on May 4, 2003, in a move that puzzled many Hornets players (including Baron Davis) who enjoyed playing for him.

Silas was head coach of the Cleveland Cavaliers from 2003 to 2005. Hired to mentor 18-year-old rookie LeBron James as his first head coach as a professional player, Silas' tenure was rife with controversy as he feuded with veteran point guard Eric Snow. The new owner of the team Dan Gilbert fired him in the middle of the season with the Cavaliers at 34–30 and fifth place in the Eastern Conference. The Cavs collapsed after Silas' firing, missing the playoffs with a 42–40 record after losing a tiebreaker with the New Jersey Nets.

Silas then worked for ESPN, although in April 2007, he interviewed for the vacant head coaching position with the Charlotte Bobcats (later known as the Charlotte Hornets) which was eventually filled by Sam Vincent. Upon the firing of Vincent in April 2008, he stated that coaching the Bobcats would be a "dream job."

On December 22, 2010, Silas was named interim head coach of the Bobcats, replacing the outgoing coach Larry Brown. On February 16, 2011, the Bobcats removed his interim status. In 2011–12, Charlotte had a league-worst 7–59 record, the worst winning percentage in league history (.106). On April 30, 2012, the Bobcats announced that Silas would not return for the 2012–2013 season.

Personal life
Silas married Carolyn Kemp in 1966. They had two children, Paula and Stephen. Silas had a stepdaughter, Donna, from Carolyn's first marriage. His son, Stephen, was added to his Charlotte coaching staff in 2000.

Silas died of cardiac arrest on December 10, 2022, at home in Denver, North Carolina. He was 79.

Career statistics

NBA playing statistics

Source

Regular season

|-
| style="text-align:left;"| 
| style="text-align:left;"| St. Louis
| 79 ||  || 15.7 || .373 ||  || .506 || 7.3 || .6 ||  ||  || 4.6
|-
| style="text-align:left;"| 
| style="text-align:left;"| St. Louis
| 46 ||  || 12.7 || .405 ||  || .574 || 5.1 || .5 ||  ||  || 3.8
|-
| style="text-align:left;"| 
| style="text-align:left;"| St. Louis
| 77 ||  || 20.4 || .429 ||  || .531 || 8.7 || 1.0 ||  ||  || 6.8
|-
| style="text-align:left;"| 
| style="text-align:left;"| St. Louis
| 82 ||  || 32.3 || .458 ||  || .705 || 11.7 || 2.0 ||  ||  || 13.4
|-
| style="text-align:left;"| 
| style="text-align:left;"| Atlanta
| 79 ||  || 23.5 || .419 ||  || .613 || 9.4 || 1.8 ||  ||  || 8.7
|-
| style="text-align:left;"| 
| style="text-align:left;"| Phoenix
| 78 ||  || 36.4 || .464 ||  || .607 || 11.7 || 2.7 ||  ||  || 12.8
|-
| style="text-align:left;"| 
| style="text-align:left;"| Phoenix
| 81 ||  || 36.3 || .428 ||  || .685 || 12.5 || 3.0 ||  ||  || 11.9
|-
| style="text-align:left;"| 
| style="text-align:left;"| Phoenix
| 80 ||  || 38.5 || .470 ||  || .773 || 11.9 || 4.3 ||  ||  || 17.5
|-
| style="text-align:left;"| 
| style="text-align:left;"| Boston
| 80 ||  || 32.7 || .470 ||  || .700 || 13.0 || 3.1 ||  ||  || 13.3
|-
| style="text-align:left; background:#afe6ba;"| †
| style="text-align:left;"| Boston
| style="background:#CFECEC; width:1em"|82* ||  || 31.7 || .440 ||  || .783 || 11.2 || 2.3 || .8 || .2 || 11.5
|-
| style="text-align:left;"| 
| style="text-align:left;"| Boston
| 82 ||  || 32.5 || .417 ||  || .709 || 12.5 || 2.7 || .7 || .3 || 10.6
|-
| style="text-align:left; background:#afe6ba;"| †
| style="text-align:left;"| Boston
| 81 ||  || 32.9 || .426 ||  || .709 || 12.7 || 2.5 || .7 || .4 || 10.7
|-
| style="text-align:left;"| 
| style="text-align:left;"| Denver
| 81 ||  || 24.2 || .360 ||  || .667 || 7.5 || 1.6 || .7 || .3 || 7.2
|-
| style="text-align:left;"| 
| style="text-align:left;"| Seattle
| 82 ||  || 26.5 || .397 ||  || .586 || 8.2 || 1.8 || .8 || .2 || 5.8
|-
| style="text-align:left; background:#afe6ba;"| †
| style="text-align:left;"| Seattle
| style="background:#CFECEC; width:1em"|82* ||  || 23.9 || .423 ||  || .598 || 7.0 || 1.4 || .4 || .2 || 5.6
|-
| style="text-align:left;"| 
| style="text-align:left;"| Seattle
| 82 ||  || 19.5 || .378 || – || .654 || 5.3 || .8 || .3 || .1 || 3.8
|- class="sortbottom"
| style="text-align:center;" colspan="2"| Career
| 1,254 ||  || 27.9 || .432 || – || .673 || 9.9 || 2.1 || .6 || .2 || 9.4
|- class="sortbottom"
| style="text-align:center;" colspan="2"| All-Star
| 2 || 0 || 15.0 || .200 ||  || .800 || 5.5 || 1.5 || 4.0 || .0 || 4.0

Playoffs

|-
| style="text-align:left;"| 1965
| style="text-align:left;"| St. Louis
| 4 ||  || 10.5 || .400 ||  || .750 || 4.5 || .3 ||  ||  || 2.8
|-
| style="text-align:left;"| 1966
| style="text-align:left;"| St. Louis
| 7 ||  || 11.4 || .278 ||  || .727 || 4.9 || .3 ||  ||  || 2.6
|-
| style="text-align:left;"| 1967
| style="text-align:left;"| St. Louis
| 8 ||  || 15.3 || .250 ||  || .611 || 6.5 || .8 ||  ||  || 3.6
|-
| style="text-align:left;"| 1968
| style="text-align:left;"| St. Louis
| 6 ||  || 29.7 || .431 ||  || .711 || 9.5 || 3.5 ||  ||  || 11.8
|-
| style="text-align:left;"| 1969
| style="text-align:left;"| Atlanta
| 11 ||  || 23.5 || .362 ||  || .514 || 8.4 || 1.9 ||  ||  || 5.5
|-
| style="text-align:left;"| 1970
| style="text-align:left;"| Phoenix
| 7 ||  || 40.9 || .422 ||  || .656 || 15.9 || 4.3 ||  ||  || 16.1
|-
| style="text-align:left;"| 1973
| style="text-align:left;"| Boston
| 13 ||  || 39.4 || .392 ||  || .620 || 15.1 || 3.0 ||  ||  || 9.6
|-
| style="text-align:left; background:#afe6ba;"| 1974†
| style="text-align:left;"| Boston
| 18 ||  || 31.9 || .397 ||  || .830 || 10.6 || 2.6 || .7 || .5 || 8.0
|-
| style="text-align:left;"| 1975
| style="text-align:left;"| Boston
| 11 ||  || 36.8 || .457 ||  || .640 || 11.8 || 3.6 || 1.1 || .2 || 9.1
|-
| style="text-align:left; background:#afe6ba;"| 1976†
| style="text-align:left;"| Boston
| 18 ||  || 41.2 || .448 ||  || .812 || 13.7 || 2.3 || 1.3 || .3 || 10.8
|-
| style="text-align:left;"| 1977
| style="text-align:left;"| Denver
| 6 ||  || 23.5 || .424 ||  || .542 || 6.7 || 2.7 || .3 || .7 || 6.8
|-
| style="text-align:left;"| 1978
| style="text-align:left;"| Seattle
| 22 ||  || 27.5 || .351 ||  || .683 || 8.5 || 1.6 || .5 || .3 || 4.9
|-
| style="text-align:left; background:#afe6ba;"| 1979†
| style="text-align:left;"| Seattle
| 17 ||  || 24.6 || .389 ||  || .674 || 5.8 || 1.1 || .5 || .3 || 4.3
|-
| style="text-align:left;"| 1980
| style="text-align:left;"| Seattle
| 15 ||  || 17.1 || .302 || – || .846 || 5.0 || 1.0 || .6 || .1 || 2.5
|- class="sortbottom"
| style="text-align:center;" colspan="2"| Career
| 163 ||  || 28.7 || .397 || – || .692 || 9.4 || 2.1 || .8 || .3 || 6.9

Head coaching record

Source:

|-
| style="text-align:left;"|San Diego
| style="text-align:left;"|
|82||36||46||.439|| style="text-align:center;"|5th in Pacific||—||—||—||—
| style="text-align:center;"|Missed Playoffs
|- 
| style="text-align:left;"|San Diego
| style="text-align:left;"|
|82||17||65||.207|| style="text-align:center;"|6th in Pacific||—||—||—||—
| style="text-align:center;"|Missed Playoffs
|- 
| style="text-align:left;"|San Diego
| style="text-align:left;"|
|82||25||57||.305|| style="text-align:center;"|6th in Pacific||—||—||—||—
| style="text-align:center;"|Missed Playoffs
|- 
| style="text-align:left;"|Charlotte
| style="text-align:left;"|
|35||22||13||.629|| style="text-align:center;"|5th in Central||—||—||—||—
| style="text-align:center;"|Missed Playoffs
|- 
| style="text-align:left;"|Charlotte
| style="text-align:left;"|
|82||49||33||.598|| style="text-align:center;"|2nd in Central||4||1||3||.250
| style="text-align:center;"|Lost in First Round
|- 
| style="text-align:left;"|Charlotte
| style="text-align:left;"|
|82||46||36||.561|| style="text-align:center;"|3rd in Central||10||6||4||.600
| style="text-align:center;"|Lost in Conf. Semifinals
|- 
| style="text-align:left;"|Charlotte
| style="text-align:left;"|
|82||44||38||.537|| style="text-align:center;"|2nd in Central||9||4||5||.444
| style="text-align:center;"|Lost in Conf. Semifinals
|- 
| style="text-align:left;"|New Orleans
| style="text-align:left;"|
|82||47||35||.573|| style="text-align:center;"|3rd in Central||6||2||4||.333
| style="text-align:center;"|Lost in First Round
|- 
| style="text-align:left;"|Cleveland
| style="text-align:left;"|
|82||35||47||.427|| style="text-align:center;"|5th in Central||—||—||—||—
| style="text-align:center;"|Missed Playoffs
|- 
| style="text-align:left;"|Cleveland
| style="text-align:left;"|
|64||34||30||.531|| style="text-align:center;"|(fired)||—||—||—||—
| style="text-align:center;"|—
|- 
| style="text-align:left;"|Charlotte
| style="text-align:left;"|
|54||25||29||.463|| style="text-align:center;"|4th in Southeast||—||—||—||—
| style="text-align:center;"|Missed Playoffs
|- 
| style="text-align:left;"|Charlotte
| style="text-align:left;"|
|66||7||59||.106|| style="text-align:center;"|5th in Southeast||—||—||—||—
| style="text-align:center;"|Missed Playoffs
|- class="sortbottom"
| style="text-align:left;"|Career
| ||875||387||488||.442|| ||29||13||16||.448||

See also
List of National Basketball Association career games played leaders
List of National Basketball Association career rebounding leaders
List of National Basketball Association career playoff rebounding leaders
List of NCAA Division I men's basketball players with 30 or more rebounds in a game
List of NCAA Division I men's basketball season rebounding leaders
List of NCAA Division I men's basketball career rebounding leaders

References

External links

 BasketballReference.com: Paul Silas (as coach)

1943 births
2022 deaths
African-American basketball coaches
African-American basketball players
All-American college men's basketball players
American men's basketball coaches
American men's basketball players
Atlanta Hawks players
Basketball coaches from Arkansas
Basketball coaches from California
Basketball players from Arkansas
Basketball players from Oakland, California
Boston Celtics players
Charlotte Bobcats head coaches
Charlotte Hornets assistant coaches
Charlotte Hornets head coaches
Cleveland Cavaliers head coaches
Creighton Bluejays men's basketball players
Denver Nuggets players
National Basketball Association All-Stars
National Basketball Association broadcasters
National Basketball Players Association presidents
New Jersey Nets assistant coaches
New Orleans Hornets head coaches
New York Knicks assistant coaches
Parade High School All-Americans (boys' basketball)
People from Prescott, Arkansas
Phoenix Suns assistant coaches
Phoenix Suns players
Power forwards (basketball)
San Diego Clippers head coaches
Seattle SuperSonics players
St. Louis Hawks draft picks
St. Louis Hawks players